Joaquim 'Jucie' Manuel Welo Lupeta (born 24 March 1993) is a Portuguese professional footballer who plays for Israeli club Maccabi Jaffa F.C. as a forward.

Club career
Born in Lourinhã, Lisbon, Lupeta played youth football for three clubs, including FC Porto between 2006 and 2012. In May 2013, he joined Hungarian side Videoton FC. He featured rarely in his one-year tenure, playing 14 official matches and scoring five goals in the Ligakupa to help his team reach the final.

In summer 2014, Lupeta returned to his country and signed a two-year contract with Vitória de Setúbal. He scored his first goal in the Primeira Liga in only his third appearance in the competition, starting and contributing to a 2–0 home win against C.D. Nacional.

Lupeta subsequently competed in the South African Premier Division, in representation of Bidvest Wits F.C. and Ajax Cape Town FC. On 25 February 2017, he joined NK Celje of the Slovenian PrvaLiga.

In late August 2018, Lupeta moved to NK Olimpija Ljubljana in the same country and league on a three-year deal. On 2 September, he helped the hosts beat NK Rudar Velenje 5–0 by netting in the 34th minute through a bicycle kick.

On 5 November 2020, Lupeta terminated his contract with Olimpija and joined Israeli team Maccabi Petah Tikva FC. In June 2021 he moved to the Romanian Liga I, having a very brief spell with FC Argeș Pitești before signing a two-year deal with FC Botoșani.

International career
Lupeta represented Portugal at under-18 level. He scored on his debut on 25 November 2010, in a 5–0 friendly rout of Montenegro held in Agualva-Cacém.

Personal life
Lupeta is of Congolese descent. Outside of his football career, he is also an entrepreneur and has his own brand of clothing.

Club statistics

Honours
Videoton
Ligakupa runner-up: 2013–14

Olimpija Ljubljana
Slovenian Football Cup: 2018–19

References

External links

Stats at HLSZ 

1993 births
Living people
Portuguese people of Democratic Republic of the Congo descent
Sportspeople from Lisbon District
Black Portuguese sportspeople
Portuguese footballers
Association football forwards
Primeira Liga players
FC Porto players
Padroense F.C. players
Vitória F.C. players
Nemzeti Bajnokság I players
Fehérvár FC players
South African Premier Division players
Bidvest Wits F.C. players
Cape Town Spurs F.C. players
Slovenian PrvaLiga players
NK Celje players
NK Olimpija Ljubljana (2005) players
Israeli Premier League players
Liga Leumit players
Maccabi Petah Tikva F.C. players
Maccabi Jaffa F.C. players
Liga I players
FC Argeș Pitești players
FC Botoșani players
Portugal youth international footballers
Portuguese expatriate footballers
Expatriate footballers in Hungary
Expatriate soccer players in South Africa
Expatriate footballers in Slovenia
Expatriate footballers in Israel
Expatriate footballers in Romania
Portuguese expatriate sportspeople in Hungary
Portuguese expatriate sportspeople in South Africa
Portuguese expatriate sportspeople in Slovenia
Portuguese expatriate sportspeople in Israel
Portuguese expatriate sportspeople in Romania